World of Subways is a series of subway simulations created by TML-Studios. There are currently four volumes. All volumes are standalone programs and can not be modified. Unlike most train simulations, the routes are short and modeled at near-reality detail levels. Each volume has only one route included with no other routes available, with the exception of Volume 1; however, the total amount of drivable track in Volume 1 is significantly less than other volumes with only 13.8 miles included.

World of Subways Volume 1: The PATH 

Volume 1 takes place in the PATH (Port Authority Trans-Hudson) system. It covers the entire rail system of 22.2 km (13.8 mi) of track and 13 stations, which connects between the downtown areas in the borough of Manhattan in New York City and a few cities in the state of New Jersey. Usable rolling stock includes the refurbished PA2 and PA3 rail cars and the non-refurbished PA4 rail cars.

An expansion pack was released containing five new missions and additional options.

World of Subways Volume 2: U7 - Berlin 

Volume 2 was the next product in continuing the World of Subways series. It takes place in the Berlin U-Bahn' U7 line, the longest line in the system, covering 31.8 km (19.8 mi) and 40 stations between Rathaus Spandau and Rudow. Unlike the other volumes, the entire route is underground. Usable rolling stock includes the F 90 and the H 01 subway cars.

World of Subways Volume 3: London Underground Circle Line

Volume 3 continues the World of Subways series with the Circle line service of the London Underground. The Circle Line covers 27 km (16.8 mi) of track and 35 stations, including the extension to Hammersmith, that runs above and below ground through London. The Circle Line operates in two directions: "Inner Rail" (anti-clockwise, Edgware Road - Hammersmith) and "Outer Rail" (clockwise, Hammersmith - Edgware Road).

Unlike the previous volumes, players have a visible character in third-person view, but the majority of the simulation is still in first-person view. Also unlike the previous versions, there is no exterior camera and the player can board and travel on other Circle Line trains not controlled by the player.  The only usable rolling stock is the C Stock subway cars.  The D Stock is also included, which runs on the District line but the player can not board or control this type of rolling stock. The C Stock was also included on another line, the Hammersmith & City line and again the player can not board or control this train. 

World of Subways Volume 3 was praised for the trains looking very similar to their real-life counterparts. 

Unlike all the other volumes of this series, Volume 3 was published by Excalibur Publishing as well as Aerosoft.

World of Subways Volume 4: New York Line 7

Despite the fact that Aerosoft, the publisher of the series, announced that volume 4 would be set on a line on the Paris Métro, TML-Studios publicly released pictures and information that Volume 4 will instead be set on the New York City Subway system in New York City, based on the 7 service. Also, this will be the first time the series is not set in the era at the time of the release.  Instead, it is set in the late 1980s-early 1990s era, when the R33S and R36 subway cars were still operational, and prior to the opening of 34th Street–Hudson Yards on September 13, 2015.

References 

Train simulation video games
TML-Studios games
Video game franchises introduced in 2008
Video games developed in Germany